Garzón is a village in the Maldonado Department of southeastern Uruguay.

Garzón is also the name of the municipality to which the village belongs. It includes the following zones: Garzón, Faro José Ignacio, Playa Juanita, Puntas de José Ignacio, Cañada de la Cruz, Costas de José Ignacio, Laguna Garzón. The Laguna Garzón Bridge is a notable local landmark.

Geography

History
On 21 August 1936, the populated nucleus here was declared a "Pueblo" (village) by the Act of Ley Nº 9.587.

Population
In 2011 Garzón had a population of 198. According to the Intendencia Departamnetal de Maldonado, the municipality of Garzón has a population of 900.
 
Source: Instituto Nacional de Estadística de Uruguay

Places of worship
 Our Lady of Mercy Chapel (Roman Catholic)

References

External links
INE map of Garzón

Populated places in the Maldonado Department